Brigadier Sir Frank Medlicott CBE (10 November 1903 – 9 January 1972) was a National Liberal Party and later Liberal Party politician in the United Kingdom.

He first stood for parliament as a Liberal, contesting Acton in 1929.

He was elected as a National Liberal Member of Parliament (MP) for East Norfolk at a by-election in 1939 after the National Liberal MP Viscount Elmley had succeeded to the peerage as the 8th Earl Beauchamp.

After the Woolton-Teviot agreement in 1947, The National Liberals and Conservative Party merged local party associations and fielded joint candidates. Many candidates, including Medlicott, described themselves as "Conservative and National Liberal", or other permutations of the two names.

When the East Norfolk constituency was abolished for the 1950 general election, Medlicott was elected as Conservative and National Liberal MP for Central Norfolk. In November 1956 Medlicott was a firm opponent of the Eden government's decision to invade the Suez canal zone, but his stance was not supported by the Central Norfolk Conservative and National Liberal Association which passed a resolution dissociating themselves from the views of their MP.

On 1 May 1957 Medlicott announced that he would not contest the next election, writing to the association to tell them that he rejected their view that the Member of Parliament should do what party leaders tell him. In November 1957, Medlicott resigned the Conservative whip. He was invited to be the Liberal Party candidate for the constituency but declined, and in November 1958 he applied to receive the Conservative whip again (which was granted). Medlicott duly retired from the House of Commons at the 1959 election. He re-joined the Liberal Party, however, he did not stand again for election. From 1969 he served as the Liberal Party's National Treasurer.

See also 
 1939 East Norfolk by-election

References

Further reading
Sir Frank Medlicott, The life and political career of a Liberal and Liberal National MP and activist by David Dutton: Journal of Liberal History, Issue 51, Summer 2006

External links 

1903 births
1972 deaths
Members of the Parliament of the United Kingdom for English constituencies
National Liberal Party (UK, 1931) politicians
UK MPs 1935–1945
UK MPs 1945–1950
UK MPs 1950–1951
UK MPs 1951–1955
UK MPs 1955–1959
Liberal Party (UK) parliamentary candidates
Knights Bachelor
Commanders of the Order of the British Empire
Royal Artillery soldiers
Royal Artillery officers
British Army personnel of World War II